Keymon Ache  is an Indian animated television series produced by DQ Entertainment International, which aired on Nickelodeon India. It was the first Indian non-mythological animated show that was produced completely locally.

The show is about the life of an ordinary boy who has a magical school bag named Keymon.

Synopsis
9 year old Rohan Tendulkar gets a gift from his father. The gift is a magical school bag from Toyland called Keymon Ache from Japan. It can speak and enchant other toys. This changes Rohan's life forever.

Characters

Main characters
 Keymon Ache: Keymon is one of the main character of the series. He is a magical school bag was given by his father as a gift. He can speak and enchant other toys. He is from Toyland, Japan and can speak Toylish language, the language of the toys of Japan. His magic chant is 'appal pappal chappal chaat, Toylish me sunlo meri baat'. His magic mostly creates trouble. He is like a brother to Rohan.
 Rohan Tendulkar: Rohan is one of the main character of the series. He is an ordinary student of K A Concept School who lives with his parents and Keymon. He misuses Keymon's magic in sometimes. His friends are Rahul and Mini, while his rival is Sid. He often gets scolded by his mother and gets punished by his class teacher. He loves watching cartoons and playing with Khel Singh and Ballji Bopta.

Supporting characters
 Mini: She is Rohan's school friend. Rohan and Rahul have a crush on her. She is not interested in Keymon's magic and not afraid of Sid, unlike Rohan and Rahul.
 Rahul: He is Rohan's school friend. He never misuses Keymon's magic. He is jealous of Rohan when he misuses Keymon's magic and shows off. He wears circular glasses and he is small in height. He has a rich family.
 Siddharth: He is the school bully. He always troubles Rohan and Rahul. He mostly takes Rahul's tiffin. He is very good as a batsman in cricket. He even steals the objects belonging to Rohan when they are enchanted by Keymon.
 Radha Tendulkar: She is Rohan's mother, Shyam Tendulkar's wife. She often scolds Rohan and Keymon, but loves them a lot.
 Shyam Tendulkar: He is Rohan's father, Radha's husband. He rarely scolds Keymon and Rohan. He works in an office. His boss in his office calls him 'Tendulkar saahb'.
 Mishra Sir: He is Rohan's class teacher. He often scolds Rohan due to Keymon's antics. He has a black mustache and black hair.
 Tyrus sir: He is the principal of K A Concept School. He is very strict.
 Khel Singh: He is a portable gaming console enchanted by Keymon to help Rohan. He has a Bihari accent. He is red-colored. He is very talkative and says 'khaamosh' most of the time.
Ballji Bopta: He is a football enchanted by Keymon to win a football match. He is yellow and black colored. He has a Nepali accent.
 Cartoon: He is a toy car enchanted by Keymon. He makes a siren sound with a red light if their parents are coming to their room. He also agrees with what Keymon says. He is red-colored.
Mr Sharma: He is a neighbour of the Tendulkar family. His car was always being damaged by Keymon and Rohan, so he hates Keymon and Rohan.
Dadaji: He is Rohan's grandfather, Radha's father-in-law, Shyam Tendulkar's father. He doesn't have teeth, so he eats with the help of Denture.
Raja and Baja: Raja and Baja are sidekick of Sid.
Neha: She is Rohan and Rahul's old friend. She always cried for small things. So, Rohan and Rahul broke her friendship.
 DJ Danger: He is a DJ controller enchanted by Keymon. He plays music.

Episodes
 Episode 1 : Monkey Keymon
 Episode 2 : Keymon in School
 Episode 3 : Burger
 Episode 4 : House Cleaning 
 Episode 5 : Khaamoshi
 Episode 6 : Ballji
 Episode 7 : Dancing Shoes
 Episode 8 : A Different Cow 
 Episode 9 : Magical Clock
 Episode 10 : Talent Show
 Episode 11 : Magic Spray
 Episode 12 : Sports Day 
 Episode 13 : Double Trouble 
 Episode 14 : Double Trouble (Part 2)
 Episode 15 : Report Card 
 Episode 16 : Rohan becomes I'll
 Episode 17 : Tuition Teacher 
 Episode 18 : Chocolate Keymon
 Episode 19 : Keymon @ Filmstar
 Episode 20 : Khel Singh becomes Ill
 Episode 21 : The Legends of Holi
 Episode 22 : Holi hai Holi
 Episode 23 : Crazy Keymon
 Episode 24 : Fight between Mom and Dad
 Episode 25 : Majestic Maestro
 Episode 26 : Tooth Ache ka Saath
 Episode 27 : Neha a new girl friend
 Episode 28 : Tiffangiri
 Episode 29 : Dabaang Keymon 
 Episode 30 : Rohan & Rahul Friendship 
 Episode 31 : Diwali ka School Drama
 Episode 32 : Diwali Dhamaka
 Episode 33 : Bhoot Bungalow 
 Episode 34 : Bhool Bulaya
 Episode 35 : Cartoon race
 Episode 36 : Mummicopter
 Episode 37 : Mini's Birthday Gift 
 Episode 38 : Pyramid Power
 Episode 39 : Rahul Vs Sid
 Episode 40 : TV Trouble
 Episode 41 : Amusement Park 
 Episode 42 : Metro Train

Film

A film named Keymon & Nani in Space Adventure based on the series was released in theatres on 9 November 2012. The character of Nani in this film was played by an animated version of Usha Uthup.

Home video 
Nickelodeon released a DVD containing 6 episodes of 11 minutes of Dance Dance, featuring Keymon doing dance sequences. Each episode has a theme that teaches children the importance of values such as cleanliness or friendship.

References 

2011 Indian television series debuts
Indian children's animated comedy television series
Hindi-language Nickelodeon original programming
Nickelodeon (Indian TV channel) original programming
Animated television series about children
Animated television series about monkeys